Stephen Mark Hawkins OAM (born 14 January 1971) is an Australian former national champion, World Champion and Olympic gold medal winning lightweight rower.

Club and state rowing 
Hawkins' senior rowing was from the Lindisfarne Rowing Club near Hobart. He commenced contesting the national lightweight single sculls title at the Australian Rowing Championships in 1990, coached by his father Stephen Hawkins Snr. In 1991 he beat out his Tasmanian rival Simon Burgess and claimed his first national lightweight championship in the single sculls. He won that same title at Australian Rowing Championships in 1993 and 1994. In 1992 he placed second behind Peter Antonie in the heavyweight single sculls Australian championship.

From 1989 to 1994 he was the Tasmanian state representative picked to race the President's Cup – the open heavyweight single scull – at the Interstate Regatta within the Australian Rowing Championships. He won the interstate championship for Tasmania in 1993.

International representative rowing
Hawkins first competed at a FISA event at the 1990 World Rowing Championships in his home state of Tasmania – in a lightweight quad scull with Burgess, Gary Lynagh and Bruce Hick. They won the bronze medal. The following year at Vienna 1991 that same crew  won gold and a World Championship title. They rowed through the field and won by 0.23 seconds.

In 1992 Hawkins was selected in the Olympic heavyweight double scull with Peter Antonie to compete at Barcelona 1992. Antonie, a veteran of 15 years of international competition was, like Hawkins a lightweight and they were respectively Australia's #1 & #2 ranked scullers ahead of the heavyweights Richard Powell and Jason Day. The selectors felt that Antonie would be unlikely to win the single scull event but using a weight corrected ergo score methodology determined that Antonie and Hawkins together could be competitive in the double. They prepared perfectly, raced superbly and won the Olympic gold.

For Roudnice 1993 and Indianapolis 1994 Hawkins was selected as Australia's lightweight single sculler. He rowed to second place and a silver medal in 1993 behind Great Britain's Peter Haining. In 1994 he finished in twelfth place.

Hawkins was inducted into the Tasmanian Sporting Hall of Fame in 2003.

References

1971 births
Living people
Australian male rowers
Rowers at the 1992 Summer Olympics
Olympic rowers of Australia
Olympic gold medalists for Australia
Recipients of the Medal of the Order of Australia
Olympic medalists in rowing
Medalists at the 1992 Summer Olympics
World Rowing Championships medalists for Australia
20th-century Australian people